Sunnyside High School can refer to one of many secondary schools, including:

United States:
Sunnyside High School (Fresno)
Sunnyside High School (Tucson, Arizona)
Sunnyside High School (Sunnyside, Washington)